KTLO 1240 AM is a radio station licensed to Mountain Home, Arkansas.  The station broadcasts a country music format and is owned by Mountain Lakes Broadcasting Corp.

References

External links
KTLO's website

TLO
Country radio stations in the United States
Mountain Home, Arkansas
1953 establishments in Arkansas